Jason Edward Dietrich (born November 15, 1972) is a baseball coach and former pitcher, who is the current head baseball coach of the Cal State Fullerton Titans. He played college baseball at Santa Ana College before transferring to Pepperdine where he played for head coach Andy Lopez in 1994 before playing professionally from 1995 to 1998.

Playing career
Dietrich attended Mater Dei High School, in Santa Ana, California and played college baseball at Santa Ana College. He was drafted in the 23rd round of the 1993 Major League Baseball draft by the New York Yankees, but he chose not to sign. He then transferred to Pepperdine University where he pitched for the Waves, earning Honorable Mention All-West Coast Conference in 1994. Dietrich was drafted in the 19th round of the 1994 Major League Baseball draft by the Colorado Rockies. Dietrich spent three years in the Rockies' organization before pitching for the New Jersey Jackals and ultimately deciding to retire from playing following the 1998 season.

Coaching career
In 1999, Dietrich began serving as the pitching coach at Arcadia High School in Arcadia, California. In 2002, he moved onto Los Angeles City College as the team's pitching coach. Following a single season at Los Angeles City College, he was named the pitching coach at Irvine Valley College, where he served for 4 seasons. On December 11, 2006, Dietrich was named the pitching coach at Cal State Los Angeles. In the Fall of 2012, Dietrich was named the pitching coach at Cal State Fullerton. Following the 2016 season, Dietrich was named the Collegiate Baseball Pitching Coach of the Year.

Following his award winning season, he was named the pitching coach at Oregon. On September 15, 2019, Dietrich was named the pitching coach for the East Carolina Pirates.

On June 30, 2021, Dietrich return to Cal State Fullerton, this time as the head coach.

Head coaching record

References

External links

Cal State Fullerton Titans bio

1972 births
Living people
Baseball players from California
Asheville Tourists players
Cal State Fullerton Titans baseball coaches
East Carolina Pirates baseball coaches
High school baseball coaches in the United States
Irvine Valley Lasers baseball coaches
Los Angeles City Cubs baseball coaches
New Jersey Jackals players
Oregon Ducks baseball coaches
Pepperdine Waves baseball players
Portland Rockies players
Salem Avalanche players
Santa Ana Dons baseball players
UC Irvine Anteaters baseball coaches